The Lookalike is a 2014 American Crime thriller film directed by Richard Gray and written by Michele Gray. The film stars Justin Long, Jerry O'Connell, Gillian Jacobs, Scottie Thompson, John Corbett, Gina Gershon, Steven Bauer, John Savage, and Luis Guzmán. It was released in the United States on November 7, 2014, by Well Go USA Entertainment.

Premise
Drug lord William Spinks has a curious obsession with Sadie Hill and uses family friends Bobby and Frank to get to her. However, when Sadie's death jeopardizes a major deal, Bobby and Frank set out to find a replacement, a lookalike to fool Spinks. The shady plan propels a former basketball champion, a deaf beauty, an addict, and an aspiring actress into an unlikely romance and a desperate quest to start over.

Cast
 Justin Long as Holt Mulligan
 John Corbett as Bobby Zan
 Gillian Jacobs as Lacey Fitzgerald / Sadie Hill
 Jerry O'Connell as Joe Mulligan
 Gina Gershon as Lee Garner
 Scottie Thompson as Mila
 Luis Guzmán as Vincent
 Steven Bauer as Frank
 John Savage as William Spinks
 Felisha Terrell as Drew
 Michael Yebba as Detective Stein
 Billy Slaughter as bubbly birthday dude

Production
Australian film producer Kaine Harling green-lighted the film into pre-production in early 2012.

Principal photography took place from December 3, 2012, to January 18, 2013, in New Orleans and the Bahamas. Filming was previously set to begin on November 26, 2012.

On February 8, 2013, Arclight Films acquired the international rights to The Lookalike. On November 11, 2013, Well Go USA Entertainment acquired the North American rights to the film. It was released theatrically and on Digital HD in the United States on November 7, 2014.

References

External links
 
 

2010s comedy thriller films
2010s crime comedy films
2014 comedy films
2014 crime thriller films
2014 films
American comedy thriller films
American crime comedy films
American crime thriller films
American gangster films
Films about organized crime in the United States
Films about the illegal drug trade
Films directed by Richard Gray
Films shot in New Orleans
Films shot in the Bahamas
2010s English-language films
2010s American films